The Lion and the Unicorn are symbols of the United Kingdom. They are, properly speaking, heraldic supporters appearing in the full royal coat of arms of the United Kingdom. The lion stands for England and the unicorn for Scotland. The combination therefore dates back to the 1603 accession of James I of England who was already James VI of Scotland. By extension, they are also  used in the arms of Newfoundland since 1637, the arms of Hanover between 1837–1866, and the arms of Canada since 1921.

Nursery rhyme
The traditional legend of enmity between the two heraldic animals is recorded in a nursery rhyme which has a Roud Folk Song Index number of 20170. It is usually given with the lyrics:

The lion and the unicorn
Were fighting for the crown
The lion beat the unicorn
All around the town.

Some gave them white bread,
And some gave them brown;
Some gave them plum cake
and drummed them out of town.

The legend of the two animals may have been intensified by the Acts of Union 1707 and it was one year later that William King (1663–1712) recorded a verse very similar to the first stanza of the modern rhyme. This seems to have grown to include several other verses. Apart from those above only one survives:

And when he had beat him out,
He beat him in again;
He beat him three times over,
His power to maintain.

This rhyme was played upon by Lewis Carroll, who incorporated the lion and the unicorn as characters in his 1871 novel Through the Looking-Glass. Here, the crown they are fighting for belongs to the White King which, given that they are on the White side as well, makes their rivalry all the more absurd. Carroll subverts the traditional view of a lion being alert and calculating by making this particular one slow and rather stupid, although clearly the better fighter. The role of the Unicorn is likewise reversed (or mirrored, as in a looking-glass) by the fact that he sees Alice as a "monster", though he promises to start believing in her if she will believe in him. Sir John Tenniel's illustrations for the section caricature Benjamin Disraeli as the Unicorn, and William Ewart Gladstone as the Lion, alluding to the pair's frequent parliamentary battles, although there is no evidence that this was Carroll's intention.

See also

Lion and Unicorn Staircase
Royal coat of arms of Scotland
Coat of arms of Canada
Queen Elizabeth Gate

Notes

References

 Baker, E.D.  Dragon's Breath, 162-3.  New York: Bloomsbury USA Children's Books (2003).

British heraldry
English heraldry
Scottish heraldry
Lions in heraldry
British culture
Lewis Carroll characters
National symbols of the United Kingdom
Unicorns
English nursery rhymes
English children's songs
Songs about cats
Songs about horses